The Raging Moon (released in the US as Long Ago, Tomorrow) is a 1971 British romantic drama film starring Malcolm McDowell and Nanette Newman and based on the book by British novelist Peter Marshall. Adapted and directed by Bryan Forbes (Newman's husband), this "romance in wheelchairs" was considered unusual in its time owing in part to the sexual nature of the relationship between McDowell and Newman, who play disabled people. The film received two Golden Globe nominations, for Best Foreign Film (English Language), and Best Song for "Long Ago Tomorrow".

Plot
Bruce Pritchard (Malcolm McDowell) is a 24-year-old working-class man and amateur football player with a passion for life. All this changes when he finds himself struck down by an incurable degenerative disease which means he'll need to use a wheelchair for the rest of his life. He goes into a church-run home for the disabled, believing that his immediate family don't feel able to care for him. His bitterness at his fate and his dislike of the rules and regulations of the place only serve to make him more withdrawn and angry at his enforced imprisonment.

Pritchard gets to know a fellow patient, Jill Matthews (Nanette Newman), a 31-year-old woman from a wealthy family, who is also a wheelchair user, due to polio. Bruce begins to harbour romantic feelings for Matthews but, before he can make his feelings known, she leaves the institution to return home and marry longstanding fiancé, Geoffrey. However, Jill soon realises that Geoffrey is half-hearted about marrying her and so breaks off the engagement and returns to the institution.

Gradually, she is able to break through Pritchard's shell of cynicism and lack of respect for authority, bringing life back to his existence. In the process, the two fall in love and admit their feelings for each other, going on to get engaged. Bruce and Jill's difficult circumstances have resulted in them finding the love of their lives. Soon, though, Jill dies from a virus. Bruce almost returns to his depression but, because of the courage he has found within himself through knowing Jill, is able to go on living.

Cast
 Malcolm McDowell as Bruce Pritchard
 Nanette Newman as Jill Matthews
 Georgia Brown as Sarah Charles
 Barry Jackson as Bill Charles
 Gerald Sim as Reverend Carbett
 Michael Flanders as Clarence Marlow
 Margery Mason as Matron
 Geoffrey Whitehead as Harold Pritchard
 Chris Chittell as Terry
 Jack Woolgar as Bruce's Father
 Patsy Smart as Bruce's Mother
 Norman Bird as Dr. Matthews
 Constance Chapman as Mrs. Matthews
 Michael Lees as Geoffrey
 Bernard Lee as Uncle Bob
 Geoffrey Bayldon as Mr. Latbury
 Theresa Watson as Gladys
 Paul Darrow as Doctor

Production
It was based on a novel by Peter Marshall, who contracted polio when he was eighteen and lived the rest of his life in a wheelchair. (He died of pneumonia in 1972.) The novel was originally published in 1964. Kirkus Reviews called it "a short novel, written with a sharpness of intelligence and feeling, and it is altogether genuine, a word easily exploited and seldom justified." The New York Times called it a "fine, moving novel." In 1965 director Robert Butler bought the screen rights to it and another Marshall novel, Two Lives.

The novel was adapted for television by the BBC in 1967 as part of the Boy Meets Girl anthology series. The main parts were played by Ray Brooks and Anna Calder-Marshall. Dennis Potter, reviewing it for the New Statesman, said the production "kept erupting into something raw and genuine."

Film rights eventually went to producer Bruce Curtis, nephew of Harry Cohn, who had just made Otley (1969). He initially tried to finance the film through Columbia, but was turned down. Shelagh Delaney wrote a script.

Eventually Curtis took the project to Bryan Forbes who came on board as writer and director. Forbes decided to increase the age of the characters and write the lead role for his wife, Nanette Newman. Forbes was in the unusual position of being able to green-light his own film as he was head of production for EMI Films at the time. Forbes commented that he was highly criticized in some quarters for directing a film while running the studio, even though he did not take any extra salary as the director. Once the film was made some executives at EMI did not want it released but Forbes held a successful test screening which secured company support.

Reception
The film was not a success at the box office in the UK.

The film was bought for distribution in the US by Don Rugoff who spent a large amount on advertising. The American release used a new title and had two minutes cut from the wedding sequence.

Legacy
Academy Award winner Gary Oldman chose to become an actor after watching the film, particularly because of McDowell’s performance.

References

External links

The Raging Moon at BFI
Review of film at Variety
1967 TV version at BBC
"Film: A Real Love Story" by A. H. Weiler, The New York Times, 30 September 1971
Review by Ian White at Starburst, 23 November 2015

1971 films
1971 drama films
British drama films
Films shot at EMI-Elstree Studios
Films about paraplegics or quadriplegics
Films directed by Bryan Forbes
Films scored by Stanley Myers
EMI Films films
1970s English-language films
1970s British films
Films about disability